F. Llamas Street is a national tertiary road in Cebu City, Cebu, Philippines. It commences at N. Bacalso Avenue in Barangay Basak San Nicolas, passes through the junction of Tres de Abril and E. Sabellano streets and ends at the junction of Katipunan Street in Barangay Tisa. It was formerly considered as a "national aid" city road under Executive Order No. 113 issued by President Ramon Magsaysay on May 2, 1955.

The street is named after Francisco Llamas, a Cebuano revolutionary who was a member of Cebu's Katipunan led by Leon Kilat and whose house was sometimes used as the group's meeting place.

Route description 
The street begins at N. Bacalso Avenue in Barangay Basak San Nicolas beside Super Metro Basak, passes along the junction of G. Elorde Street (formerly known as Ganciang Street) which divides the said barangay with Barangay Punta Princesa and proceeds towards the Archdiocesan Shrine of Our Lady of Lourdes. Upon reaching the junction of E. Sabellano Street, which is an alternative road for passengers going to south district barangays, and Tres de Abril Street, it goes on passing through several commercial and residential establishments before it reaches Barangay Tisa by passing through a small bridge which spans the Kinalumsan River. It then crosses the junction of Cabarrubias and F. Caburnay streets, curves northwest along Gaisano Capital Tisa and curves northeast as it reaches the Tisa Barangay hall. The street ends at the junction of Katipunan Street near where most of the barangay's well-known siomai and other food stores are located.

Landmarks 
 Super Metro Basak
 Archdiocesan Shrine of Our Lady of Lourdes
 Lourdes Kindergarten School
 Metro Fresh 'N Easy Punta
 Tisa II Elementary School
 Gaisano Capital Tisa
 Tisa National High School (Day & Night)
 Tisa Barangay Hall

Connecting streets 

 G. Elorde Street
 Tres de Abril Street
 E. Sabellano Street
 Manggahan Road
 Buhisan Road

 Taurus Street
 Pisces Street
 G. Osmeña Street
 Cabarrubias Street
 F. Caburnay Street

Gallery

See also 
 List of streets in Cebu

References 

Streets in Cebu City